Five ships of the Royal Navy have been named HMS Norfolk, after the Duke of Norfolk or the county of Norfolk. The Norfolk motto is Serviens servo ("serving, I preserve").

  was an 80-gun third rate launched in 1693. She was rebuilt in 1728, and renamed HMS Princess Amelia in 1755. She was used for harbour service from 1777 and transferred to the Customs service in 1788.
  was a 74-gun third rate launched in 1757 and broken up in 1774.
  was a  heavy cruiser launched in 1928 and was scrapped in 1950.
  was a  destroyer launched in 1967. She was sold to Chile in 1982, and renamed Capitán Prat. She was decommissioned in 2006 and sold for scrap.
  was a Type 23 or 'Duke'-class frigate launched in 1987. She was paid off in 2004 and sold to Chile, being transferred in 2006 as Almirante Cochrane 

Battle Honours

 Velez Malaga 1704
 Cartagena 1741
 Toulon 1744
 Pondicherry 1760
 Manila 1762
 Atlantic 1941
 Bismarck 1941
 Arctic 1941–43
 North Africa 1942
 North Cape 1943
 Norway 1945

See also 
 
  served the Royal Navy as a hired armed defense ship from about 1803 to 1808.
 The hired armed cutter  served the Royal Navy from 1807 to 1812.

Royal Navy ship names